Micropholcus fauroti is a cellar spider species with Pantropical distribution. It has been introduced in Belgium and Germany.

See also 
 List of Pholcidae species

References

External links 

Pholcidae
Spiders of Europe
Pantropical spiders
Spiders described in 1887